Pallipram Balan (born 10 October 1939) is an Indian politician and leader of Communist Party of India. He represented Hosdurg constituency in 12th Kerala Legislative Assembly.

See also
Politics of Kerala

References

Communist Party of India politicians from Kerala
1939 births
Living people
Place of birth missing (living people)
Kerala MLAs 2006–2011